Sri Lanka petite shrub frog, (Pseudophilautus tanu), is a species of frogs in the family Rhacophoridae, endemic to southwestern Sri Lanka. This relatively recently described species is only known from two locations in the Galle District, Beraliya and Kanneliya Forest Reserves. The specific name tanu is Sinhalese for "slender" and refers to the habitus of this frog.

Description
Three adult males in the type series measure  in snout–vent length; females were not reported. The snout is obtusely pointed. The tympanum is distinct and vertically elongated. The finger tips have discs with circum-marginal grooves; there is no webbing nor dermal fringes. The toes are webbed and bear discs with circum-marginal grooves. The head and body are dorsally pale brown. There are about eight dark-brown stripes of varying width on the dorsum and a dark-brown stripe about as wide as pupil running from the snout through the pupil backward to the flank, fading away on mid-flank. The lower parts are white with some scattered brown pigment.

Habitat and conservation

Pseudophilautus tanu is a common species within its habitat. In Kanneliya, it was the most common species in the fern-dominated habitat, along with Pseudophilautus hoipollo. Nevertheless, unprotected forest edge areas are under constant pressure from human activities.

References

tanu
Endemic fauna of Sri Lanka
Frogs of Sri Lanka
Taxa named by Rohan Pethiyagoda
Amphibians described in 2009